The Morris School District is a comprehensive community public school district that serves students in pre-kindergarten through twelfth grade from three municipalities in Morris County, New Jersey, United States. The communities in the district are Morristown and Morris Township, along with students from Morris Plains in grades 9-12 who attend the district's high school as part of a sending/receiving relationship with the Morris Plains Schools.

As of the 2018–19 school year, the district, comprising 10 schools, had an enrollment of 5,216 students and 441.4 classroom teachers (on an FTE basis), for a student–teacher ratio of 11.8:1.

The district is classified by the New Jersey Department of Education as being in District Factor Group "GH", the third-highest of eight groupings. District Factor Groups organize districts statewide to allow comparison by common socioeconomic characteristics of the local districts. From lowest socioeconomic status to highest, the categories are A, B, CD, DE, FG, GH, I and J.

In addition to its PreK-12 program, the Morris School District operates a Community School that offers an extensive adult school curriculum. The Community School also provides a before and after-school childcare program, Sunrise Sunset, for Morris School District children of busy parents. Housed in each of the District's elementary schools, Sunrise Sunset offers a supervised environment in which boys and girls can work and play before and after school. The Community School's summer program, Summer Plus, provides children with a local alternative to summer camp.

History
Two schools are known to have operated in near the Green in Morristown in the 18th century. One was in use from 1732–1767; the other, known as the "Steeple School," stood from 1767 - 1799.

From the early to mid-19th century, local schools included the Franklin Street, Bridge Street, Mt. Kemble, and Washington Valley Schools.

The Maple Avenue School opened in 1869 on land donated by George T. Cobb.

An early, 18th century school, located three miles west of Morristown was described as follows: "The building was constructed of logs, and instead of glass window, sheep skins were stretched over apertures made by sawing off an occasional log.

In 1971, the district was regionalized under an order by the New Jersey Supreme Court that combined the two separate pre-existing districts, which ruled that the Commissioner of the New Jersey Department of Education can cross district lines only for desegregation purposes. The decision found that Morristown and the surrounding Morris Township constituted a "single community without visible or factually significant boundary separations" but that de facto segregation existed because Morristown had a substantial black population while the surrounding township did not. By pairing schools across the two municipalities in the merged district, the district could keep a black population at about 20% of enrollment in each elementary school.

In May 1974, the Harding Township School District was given permission by the State Commissioner of Education to end their sending / receiving relationship with the Morris School District and begin sending their students to Madison High School starting with the 1975-76 school year, ruling that the withdrawal of the mostly white students from Harding Township would not "cause a disproportionate change in the racial composition of Morristown High School".

On August 14 2019, former Sussex Avenue School principal Peter Frazzano was found guilty by Craig Carpenito the then United States Attorney For The District Of New Jersey for stealing $2.7 million from the district's health insurance plan. Frazzano will serve 10 years in a US Federal prison for this crime.

On February 24, 2021, The United States Attorney for the District of New Jersey Rachael A. Honig announced that Matthew Puccio, husband of Frelinghuysen  Middle School Guidance Counselor Carolina Puccio and brother in law of Peter Frazzano was indicted over a connection to Frazzano's health insurance scheme, if convicted Puccio faces up to 10 years in a US federal prison.

Schools
Schools in the district (with 2018–19 enrollment data from the National Center for Education Statistics) are:

Preschool
Lafayette Learning Center (102 students; in grade PreK)
Karen Andre, Principal
Elementary schools
Alexander Hamilton School (293; 3-5)
Edward Cisneros, Principal
Hillcrest School (288; K-2)
Gregory Sumski, Principal
Thomas Jefferson School (314; 3-5)
Cristina Frazzano, Principal
Normandy Park School (302; K-5)
Christopher Miller, Principal
Sussex Avenue School (301; 3-5)
Lorri Vaccaro, Principal
Alfred Vail School (297; K-2)
Janet Kellman, Principal
Woodland School (289; K-2)
Cristina Frazzano, Principal
Middle school
Frelinghuysen Middle School (1,081; 6-8)
Joseph Uglialoro, Principal
High school
Morristown High School (1,860; 9-12)
Mark Manning, Principal

Administration
Core members of the district's administration are:
Thomas Ficarra, Interim Superintendent
Anthony LoFranco, Business Administrator / Board Secretary

Board of education
The district's board of education, comprised of nine members, sets policy and oversees the fiscal and educational operation of the district through its administration. As a Type II school district, the board's trustees are elected directly by voters to serve three-year terms of office on a staggered basis, with three seats up for election each year held (since 2012) as part of the November general election. The board appoints a superintendent to oversee the day-to-day operation of the district. The nine elected seats on the board of education are allocated based on the population of the constituent municipalities, with five seats assigned to Morris Township and four to Morristown; a tenth representative is appointed by Morris Plains to represents that district's interest on the board.

References

External links
Morris School District

School Data for the Morris School District, National Center for Education Statistics

Morristown, New Jersey
Morris Plains, New Jersey
New Jersey District Factor Group GH
School districts in Morris County, New Jersey
1971 establishments in New Jersey